Wilson Architects is one of Australia's the oldest architectural practices in Australia. The firm specialises in the design of educational and laboratory spaces and facilities.

History
Wilson Architects was founded in 1884 by Alexander Brown Wilson.  After Wilson's retirement in 1928 the firm has been managed by Wilson's son, grandson, and its current managing director is Hamilton B. Wilson, Wilson's great grandson.  Wilson Architects has received a number of awards from the Australian Institute of Architects, the Australian Institute of Landscape Architects, received Australian Interior Design Awards, among others.

References

External links 
 Wilson Architects papers, 1883-1966. Wilson Architects Collection, UQFL112, Fryer Library, The University of Queensland Library.

Architecture firms of Australia